QOwnNotes is a free open source (GPL) plain-text notepad. The program has support for markdown, and includes a to-do list manager that works on FreeBSD, Linux, MacOS and Windows. It can optionally work together with the notes application of ownCloud or Nextcloud.

Reviews 
Linux Magazine,
Linux Format,
Linux Voice and
Web Upd8 
reviewed QOwnNotes.
There is a more elaborate list of reviews and articles about QOwnNotes.

See also
 Comparison of note-taking software

References

External links 

 QOwnNotes Webpage
 QOwnNotes source code repository
 qownnotesapi app page on apps.nextcloud.com

Free note-taking software
Note-taking software
Software that uses Qt